Sutorius junquilleus is a species of bolete fungus in the family Boletaceae. It is found in Europe, Central America, North America, and India, where it grows in deciduous and mixed forests. Initially uniformly yellow in color, all external surfaces of the fruit body undergo a variety of discolorations as it matures.

Habitat and distribution
The fungus is known from Europe, eastern North America, and Costa Rica,
 where it fruits on the ground in deciduous and mixed forests, usually in a mycorrhizal association with oak, but occasionally with pine. It was reported from Himachal Pradesh, India for the first time in 1993.

Taxonomy
The fungus was first described scientifically by German mycologist Franz Joseph Kallenbach in 1923, from collections made in Germany. A year later, Kallenbach published a more thorough description. Some authors have historically considered Sutorius junquilleus—a species described by Lucien Quelet in 1897—to be a synonym, including first Gilbert and Leclair in 1942, and Rolf Singer in 1947. Reid has suggested that differences are due only to climatic conditions, with the red colors appearing in conditions of lower temperature. It was transferred to the genus Neoboletus in 2015.

Description

The cap color is bright yellow when young, fading to dull yellow or tan when mature, and usually develops orange or reddish discolorations. The pore surface is initially bright yellow before turning greenish yellow to brownish yellow. Although it is usually not reticulate, the upper part of the stem may have reticulations. All parts of the mushroom stain blue to bluish black when injured. The stark color changes that occur over the lifespan of the fruit body led one author to suggest that "the mushroom's personal grooming skills go to hell in a handbasket". A variety S. junquilleus var. pallidus, found in Nova Scotia, is pale yellow with a lighter colored olive spore print compared to the nominate variety.

.

References

External links

pseudosulphureus
Fungi described in 1923
Fungi of India
Fungi of Europe
Fungi of Central America
Fungi of North America